The 32nd Annual American Music Awards were held on November 14, 2004, at the Shrine Auditorium, in Los Angeles, California. The awards recognized the most popular artists and albums from the year 2004.

Performances

Winners and nominees

References

 http://www.rockonthenet.com/archive/2004/amas.htm

2004
2004 music awards